Recorded Live: The 12 Year Old Genius is the first live album by Stevie Wonder. The album was released on the Tamla record label (catalog #240) in May 1963, the same month as the single release of "Fingertips" (catalog #54080). "Fingertips" topped both the Billboard Hot 100 chart and the R&B Singles chart, and Recorded Live: The 12 Year Old Genius topped the Billboard 200, all of which happened in 1963. This is the last album to use the "Little" in Stevie Wonder's name. Starting with the next album, he would go by just "Stevie Wonder." Wonder was the second and youngest solo artist to chart on the Billboard Top LPs under the age of 18. He was only 13 years old when that occurred.

Track listing 
Side one
"Fingertips" (Henry Cosby, Clarence Paul) – 6:40 (Little Stevie on bongos, harmonica and vocals)
"Soul Bongo" (Marvin Gaye, Paul) – 3:01 (Little Stevie on bongos)
"La La La La La" (Paul) – 2:34 (Little Stevie on drums and vocals)

Side two
"(I'm Afraid) The Masquerade Is Over" (Herbert Magidson, Allie Wrubel) – 5:13
"Hallelujah I Love Her So" (Ray Charles) – 2:48 (Little Stevie on piano and vocals)
"Drown in My Own Tears" (Henry Glover) – 3:23
"Don't You Know" (Charles, Berry Gordy) – 3:19 (Little Stevie on piano and vocals)

Chart positions

References 

1963 live albums
Stevie Wonder live albums
Albums produced by Berry Gordy
Tamla Records live albums